In thermodynamics and solid-state physics, the Debye model is a method developed by Peter Debye in 1912 for estimating the phonon contribution to the specific heat (Heat capacity) in a solid. It treats the vibrations of the atomic lattice (heat) as phonons in a box, in contrast to the Einstein photoelectron model, which treats the solid as many individual, non-interacting quantum harmonic oscillators. The Debye model correctly predicts the low-temperature dependence of the heat capacity of solids, which is proportional to  – the Debye T 3 law. Similarly to the Einstein photoelectron model, it recovers the Dulong–Petit law at high temperatures. Due to simplifying assumptions, its accuracy suffers at intermediate temperatures.

Derivation 
The Debye model is a solid-state equivalent of Planck's law of black body radiation, where one treats electromagnetic radiation as a photon gas. The Debye model treats atomic vibrations as phonons in a box (the box being the solid). Most of the calculation steps are identical as both are examples of a massless Bose gas with linear dispersion relation.

Consider a cube of side . From the particle in a box article, the resonating modes of the sonic disturbances inside the box (considering for now only those aligned with one axis) have wavelengths given by

where  is an integer. The energy of a phonon is

Making the approximation that the frequency is inversely proportional to the wavelength, we have

In three dimensions we will use

The approximation that the frequency is inversely proportional to the wavelength (giving a constant speed of sound) is good for low-energy phonons but not for high-energy phonons (see the article on phonons). This disagreement is one of the limitations of the Debye model. It produces incorrect results at intermediate temperatures, whereas the results are exact at the low and high temperatures limits.

Let's now compute the total energy in the box,

where  is the number of phonons in the box with energy . In other words, the total energy is equal to the sum of energy multiplied by the number of phonons with that energy (in one dimension). In 3 dimensions we have:

Here, the Debye model and Planck's law of black body radiation differ. Unlike electromagnetic photon radiation in a box, there is a finite number of phonon energy states because a phonon cannot have arbitrarily high frequencies. Its frequency is bounded by the medium of its propagation—the atomic lattice of the solid. Consider an illustration of a transverse phonon below.

It is reasonable to assume that the minimum wavelength of a phonon is twice the atom separation, as shown in the lower figure. There are  atoms in a solid. Our solid is a cube, which means there are   atoms per edge.

making the maximum mode number  (infinite for photons)

This number bounds the upper limit of the triple energy sum

For slowly varying, well-behaved functions, a sum can be replaced with an integral (also known as Thomas–Fermi approximation)

Their distribution is given by the famous Bose–Einstein statistics formula

Because a phonon has three possible polarization states (one longitudinal, and two transverse which approximately do not affect its
energy) the formula above must be multiplied by 3,

The Debye temperature or the effective sonic velocity is a measure of the hardness of the crystal.

Substituting into the energy integral yields

The ease with which these integrals are evaluated for photons is due to the fact that light's frequency, at least semi-classically, is unbound. As the figure above illustrates, this is not true for phonons. In order to approximate this triple integral, Debye used spherical coordinates.

and approximated the cube by an eighth of a sphere

where  is the radius of this sphere, which is found by conserving the number of particles in the cube and in the eighth of a sphere. The volume of the cube is  unit-cell volumes,

so we get

The substitution of integration over a sphere for the correct integral introduces another source of inaccuracy into the model.

The energy integral becomes
. 

To simplify the appearance
of this expression, define the Debye temperature 

where  is the volume of the cubic box of side .

Many references describe the Debye temperature as merely shorthand for some constants and material-dependent variables. However, as shown below,    is roughly equal to the phonon energy of  the minimum wavelength mode, and so we can interpret the Debye temperature as the temperature at which the highest-frequency mode (and hence every mode) is excited.

Continuing, we then have the specific internal energy:

where  is the (third) Debye function.

Differentiating with respect to  we get the dimensionless heat capacity:

These formulae treat the Debye model at all temperatures. The more elementary formulae given further down give the asymptotic behavior in the limit of low and high temperatures. As already mentioned, this behavior is exact, in contrast to the intermediate behavior. The essential reason for the exactness at low and high energies, respectively, is that the Debye model gives (i) the exact dispersion relation  at low frequencies, and (ii) corresponds to the exact density of states , concerning the number of vibrations per frequency interval.

Debye's derivation 

Debye derived his equation somewhat differently and more simply. Using continuum mechanics, he found that the number of vibrational states with a frequency less than a particular value was asymptotic to

Combining this formula with the expected energy of a harmonic oscillator at temperature T (already used by Einstein in his model) would give an energy of

if the vibrational frequencies continued to infinity. This form gives the  behaviour which is correct at low temperatures. But Debye realized that there could not be more than  vibrational states for N atoms. He made the assumption that in an atomic solid, the spectrum of frequencies of the vibrational states would continue to follow the above rule, up to a maximum frequency chosen so that the total number of states is 

Debye knew that this assumption was not really correct (the higher frequencies are more closely spaced than assumed), but it guarantees the proper behaviour at high temperature (the Dulong–Petit law). The energy is then given by

where  is the function later given the name of third-order Debye function.

Another derivation 
First we derive the vibrational frequency distribution; the following derivation is based on Appendix VI from. Consider a three-dimensional isotropic elastic solid with N atoms in the shape of a rectangular parallelepiped with side-lengths . The elastic wave will obey the wave equation and will be plane waves; consider the wave vector  and define . Note that we have

Solutions to the wave equation are

where  are positive integers. Substituting into and also using the dispersion relation , we have

The above equation, for fixed frequency , describes an eighth of an ellipse in "mode space" (an eighth because  are positive). Hence, the number of modes  with frequency in the range  is

where  is the volume of the parallelepiped. Note that the wave speed in the longitudinal direction is different from the transverse direction and that the waves can be polarised one way in the longitudinal direction and two ways in the transverse direction; thus we define .

Following the derivation from, we define an upper limit to the frequency of vibration ; since there are N atoms in the solid, there are 3N quantum harmonic oscillators (3 for each x-, y-, z- direction) oscillating over the range of frequencies . Hence we can determine  using

By defining , where k is the Boltzmann constant and h is the Planck constant, and substituting into, we get
this definition is more standard. We can find the energy contribution for all oscillators oscillating at frequency . Quantum harmonic oscillators can have energies  where   and using Maxwell-Boltzmann statistics, the number of particles with energy  is

The energy contribution for oscillators with frequency  is then

By noting that  (because there are  modes oscillating with frequency ), we have

From above, we can get an expression for 1/A; substituting it into, we have

Integrating with respect to ν yields

Low-temperature limit 

The temperature of a Debye solid is said to be low if , leading to

This definite integral can be evaluated exactly:

In the low-temperature limit, the limitations of the Debye model mentioned above do not apply, and it gives a correct relationship between (phononic) heat capacity, temperature, the elastic coefficients, and the volume per atom (the latter quantities being contained in the Debye temperature).

High-temperature limit 

The temperature of a Debye solid is said to be high if .  Using  if  leads to

where

This is the Dulong–Petit law, and is fairly accurate although it does not take into account anharmonicity, which causes the heat capacity to rise further. The total heat capacity of the solid, if it is a conductor or semiconductor, may also contain a non-negligible contribution from the electrons.

Debye versus Einstein 

The Debye and Einstein models correspond closely to experimental data, but the Debye model is correct at low temperatures whereas the Einstein model is not. To visualize the difference between the models, one would naturally plot the two on the same set of axes, but this is not immediately possible as both the Einstein model and the Debye model provide a functional form for the heat capacity. As models, they require scales to relate them to their real-world counterparts. One can see that the scale of the Einstein model is given by :

Both are usually found by fitting the models to the experimental data. (The Debye temperature can theoretically be calculated from the speed of sound and crystal dimensions.) Because the two methods approach the problem from different directions and different geometries, Einstein and Debye scales are  the same, that is to say

which means that plotting them on the same set of axes makes no sense. They are two models of the same thing, but of different scales.

then one can say

and, to relate the two, we must seek the ratio

The Einstein solid is composed of -frequency quantum harmonic oscillators, . That frequency, if it indeed existed, would be related to the speed of sound in the solid. If one imagines the propagation of sound as a sequence of atoms hitting one another, then it becomes obvious that the frequency of oscillation must correspond to the minimum wavelength sustainable by the atomic lattice, where
,
which makes the 

and the sought ratio is therefore

Using the ratio, both models can be plotted on the same graph. This ratio is the cube root of the ratio of the volume of one octant of a 3-dimensional sphere to the volume of the cube that contains it, which is just the correction factor used by Debye when approximating the energy integral above. Alternatively, the ratio of the two temperatures can be seen to be the ratio of Einstein's single frequency at which all oscillators oscillate and Debye's maximum frequency.  Einstein's single frequency can then be seen to be a mean of the frequencies available to the Debye model.

Debye temperature table 
Even though the Debye model is not completely correct, it gives a good approximation for the low temperature heat capacity of insulating, crystalline solids where other contributions (such as highly mobile conduction electrons) are negligible. In this case, the Debye model can only be said to approximate the lattice contribution to the specific heat. The following table lists Debye temperatures for several pure elements and sapphire:

The Debye model's fit to experimental data is often phenomenologically improved by allowing the Debye temperature to become temperature dependent;  for example, the value for water ice increases from about 222 K to 300 K as the temperature goes from absolute zero to about 100 K.

Extension to other quasi-particles 
For other bosonic quasi-particles, e.g., for magnons (quantized spin waves) in ferromagnets instead of the phonons (quantized sound waves) one can derive analogous results. One also has different density of states (e.g.). As a consequence, in ferromagnets one gets a magnon contribution to the heat capacity, which dominates at sufficiently low temperatures the phonon contribution, . In metals, in contrast, the main low-temperature contribution to the heat capacity, comes from the electrons. It is fermionic, and is calculated by different methods going back to Sommerfeld's free electron model.

Extension to liquids 

It was long thought that phonon theory is not able to explain the heat capacity of liquids, since liquids only sustain longitudinal, but not transverse phonons, which in solids are responsible for 2/3 of the heat capacity. However, Brillouin scattering experiments with neutrons and with X-rays, confirming an intuition of Yakov Frenkel, have shown that transverse phonons do exist in liquids, albeit restricted to frequencies above a threshold called the Frenkel frequency. Since most energy is contained in these high-frequency modes, a simple modification of the Debye model is sufficient to yield a good approximation to experimental heat capacities of simple liquids.

Debye frequency

The Debye frequency (Symbol:  or ) is a parameter in the Debye model. It refers to a cut-off angular frequency for waves of a harmonic chain of masses, used to describe the movement of ions in a crystal lattice and more specifically, to correctly predict the heat capacity in such crystals to be constant for high temperatures (Dulong–Petit law). The term was first introduced by Peter Debye in 1912.

Throughout this whole article periodic boundary conditions are assumed.

Definition 
Assuming the dispersion relation is

with  the speed of sound in the crystal; and k the wave vector, the value of the Debye frequency is as follows:

For a one dimensional monatomic chain the Debye frequency is equal to

Where the following relation holds: .

For a two dimensional monatomic square lattice the Debye frequency is equal to

For a three dimensional monatomic primitive cubic crystal, the Debye frequency is equal to

The speed of sound in the crystal could depend on (among others) the mass of the atoms, the strength of their interaction, the pressure on the system, and/or the polarization of the spin wave (longitudinal or transverse), but in the following we will first assume the speed of sound to be the same for any polarization (this assumption however does not render far-reaching implications).

The assumed dispersion relation is easily proven wrong for a one-dimensional chain of masses, but in Debye's model this did not prove to be problematic.

Relation to Debye's temperature 
The Debye temperature , another parameter in Debye model, is related to the Debye frequency by the relation  where  is the reduced Planck constant and is the Boltzmann constant.

Debye's derivation

Three dimensional crystal
In Debye's derivation of the heat capacity he sums over all possible modes of the system. That is: including different directions and polarizations. He assumed the total number of modes per polarization to be  (with  the amount of masses in the system), or in mathematical language

Debye made this assumption because he knew from classical mechanics that the number of modes per polarization in a chain of masses should always be equal to the amount of masses in the chain.

The left hand side is now to be made explicit to show how it depends on the Debye frequency (here simply introduced as a cut-off frequency, that is: higher frequencies than the Debye frequency cannot exist), so that an expression for it could be found.

Smaller wave vectors cannot exist because of the periodic boundary conditions. Thus the summation would become 4

where ;  is the size of the system; and the integral is (as the summation) over all possible modes, which is assumed to be a finite region (bounded by the cut-off frequency).

The result is

with  the absolute value of the wave vector corresponding with the Debye frequency, so .

Since we know the dispersion relation to be , this can be written as an integral over all possible 

Conclusion:

One dimensional chain in 3D space 
The same derivation could be done for a one dimensional chain of atoms. The number of modes remains unchanged, because there are still three polarizations. So

The rest of the derivation is analogous to the previous, so again the left hand side is rewritten;

In the last step the multiplication by two is because the integrand in the first integral is even and the bounds of integration are symmetric about the origin, so the integral can be rewritten as from 0 to  after scaling by a factor of 2.
We continue;

Conclusion:

Two-dimensional crystal 
The same derivation could be done for a two dimensional crystal. Again, the number of modes remains unchanged, because there are still three polarizations. The derivation is analogous to the previous two. We start with the same equation,

And then the left hand side is rewritten and equated to 

where  is the size of the system.

Conclusion

Allowing polarization to make a difference 
As mentioned in the introduction: in general, longitudinal waves have a different wave velocity than transverse waves. For clarity they were first assumed to be equal, but now we drop that assumption.

The dispersion relation becomes , where , which correspond to the three polarizations.

One dimension 
Once again the summation over the modes is rewritten

The result is

Thus the Debye frequency is found

Or by assuming the two transverse polarizations to be the same (to have the same phase speed and frequency)

One can check this relation is equivalent to the one found earlier (when polarization did not make a difference) by setting .

Two dimensions 
The same derivation can be done for a two dimensional crystal to find (the derivation is analogous to previous derivations)

Or by assuming the two transverse polarizations are equal (although for two dimensions it would be more logical if all polarizations would be different):

Again, one can check this relation is equivalent to the one found earlier by setting .

Three dimensions
The same derivation can be done for a three dimensional crystal to find (the derivation is analogous to previous derivations)

Or by assuming the two transverse polarizations are equal (although for three dimensions it would be more logical when all polarizations would be the same):

Again, one can check this relation is equivalent to the one found earlier by setting .

Derivation with the actual dispersion relation 

This problem could be made more insightful by making it more complex. Instead of using the dispersion relation , the correct dispersion relation is now going to be assumed. From classical mechanics it is known that for an equidistant chain of masses which interact harmonically with each other the dispersion relation reads as follows

After plotting this relation, it is clear that Debye's estimation of the cut-off wavelength was right after all. This means the resulting physical manifestation for the mode with the larger wavenumber is indistinguishable from the one with the smaller wavenumber. Thereby, the study of the dispersion relation can be limited to the first brillouin zone i.e. for .This is possible because the system consists of discretized points, as is demonstrated in the animated picture.

By simply inserting  in the original dispersion relation we find

Combining these results the same result is once again found

However, for diatomic chains (and more complex chains) the associated cut-off frequency (and wavelength) is not very accurate, since the cut-off wavelength is twice as big and the dispersion relation consists of two branches (for a diatomic chain). It is also not certain from this whether for more dimensional systems the cut-off frequency was accurately predicted by Debye.

Alternative derivation

For a one dimensional chain this result could also be reproduced using theory on aliasing. The Nyquist–Shannon sampling theorem is used in the following derivation; the main difference being that in the following derivation the discretization is not in time, but in space. If we use the correct dispersion relation from last paragraph, it will be clear in another insightful way why the cut-off frequency has the value previously (twice) derived. So again,

is assumed.

This derivation is completely equivalent to the previous one, that is: the same assumptions are made to retrieve the result. It is not more or less accurate, it is just a different approach.

To determine where the cut-off frequency should be, it is useful to first determine where the cut-off of the wavelength should be. From this and the periodic boundary conditions you can immediately see that the total number of modes per polarization would be .

Because, as is depicted, only waves with a longer wavelength than  could render the same physical result as another one. So this is another way to correctly predict the cut-off wavelength of phonons without using the correct dispersion relation (or even knowledge from classical mechanics as Debye did). However, using the wrong dispersion relation which Debye assumed, waves with a smaller wavelength would have a higher frequency, but the relative movement of the masses would be the same, so this does not render new modes.

Also here it does not matter which dispersion relation is used (the correct one or the one Debye used), the same cut-off frequency would be found.

Unfortunately, the same method could not be used (as easily) for a two- or three-dimensional crystal, because diagonal waves would have a larger cut-off wavelength, which are also difficult to predict.

See also 

 Bose gas
 Gas in a box
 Grüneisen parameter

References

Further reading 

CRC Handbook of Chemistry and Physics, 56th Edition (1975–1976)
Schroeder, Daniel V.  An Introduction to Thermal Physics.  Addison-Wesley, San Francisco (2000).  Section 7.5.

External links 
 Experimental determination of specific heat, thermal and heat conductivity of quartz using a cryostat.
Simon, Steven H. (2014) The Oxford Solid State Basics (most relevant ones: 1, 2 and 6)

Condensed matter physics
Thermodynamic models
American inventions